An unofficial referendum on enosis (reunification) with Greece was held in Cyprus between 15 and 22 January 1950. Only Greek Cypriots voted, and the proposal was approved by 95.71% of those taking part.

Background
On 12 December 1949, Archbishop Makarios II had called on the British authorities to hold a referendum on the future of the island. After they refused, the Church Council and the Enosis organisation organised a referendum. Signature books were provided in churches between 15 and 22 January 1950. The books had two columns, entitled "We demand union with Greece" and "We are against the union of Cyprus with Greece".

Results

Aftermath
After the referendum, the Church of Cyprus publicly admonished those who had voted against enosis. In the latter years of British rule in Cyprus, the Church sought to silence dissenting opinion among Greek Cypriots, sometimes by violent means. In February 2017, the Cypriot parliament voted in favour of commemorating the referendum in schools every year. The decision was received negatively by Turkish Cypriot politicians, causing talks between Cypriot President Nicos Anastasiades and the Turkish Cypriot leader Mustafa Akıncı to be halted.

References

Referendums in Cyprus
Cyprus
Referendum
Cyprus dispute
British Cyprus
Greek Cypriot nationalism
July 1950 events in Europe
Sovereignty referendums
Megali Idea